Robert Frédérik Louis Baetens (28 October 1930 – 19 October 2016) was a Belgian rower who competed in the 1952 Summer Olympics and in the 1956 Summer Olympics. He was born in Antwerp. In 1952 he won the silver medal with his partner Michel Knuysen in the coxless pairs event. Four years later he was eliminated with his partner Michel Knuysen in the repechage of the coxless pair competition.

References

Bob Baetens' profile at Sports Reference.com

1930 births
2016 deaths
Belgian male rowers
Olympic rowers of Belgium
Rowers at the 1952 Summer Olympics
Rowers at the 1956 Summer Olympics
Olympic silver medalists for Belgium
Olympic medalists in rowing
Medalists at the 1952 Summer Olympics
European Rowing Championships medalists
20th-century Belgian people